The University of Utah Marching Band (also known as The Pride of Utah Marching Band or simply The Pride of Utah) has been called the premier marching ensemble of the University of Utah. It has also been stated that the band has figured prominently in the state of Utah's marching music history since its earliest days. The band performs at all University of Utah home football games, as well as some away games and bowl games. Its current director is Brian Sproul.

History 
The University of Utah Athletics Department has stated that the University of Utah's band was started in the 1940s as a military ensemble performing at various ceremonies and events around the university campus. Taking a cue from college bands in the Midwest, A. Ray Olpin, President of the university, recruited Ron Gregory from Ohio State University in 1948 to establish a similar marching band for Utah. Despite early success, support for the band gradually faded during the 1960s which culminated in the termination of funding for the band by the Associated Students for the University of Utah (ASUU) in 1969. A 1976 fund-raising campaign led by Gregg I. Hanson successfully re-established the band.

The Pride of Utah has performed at the following notable events:
 The 2003 Liberty Bowl
 The 2005 BCS Tostitos Fiesta Bowl
 The 2005 Emerald Bowl
 The 2006 Armed Forces Bowl
 The 2007 Poinsettia Bowl
 The 2009 BCS Allstate Sugar Bowl
 The 2009 Poinsettia Bowl
The 2022 Rose Bowl
 The Inaugural Parade of President Barack Obama

References

External links

 

University of Utah
Musical groups from Utah

College marching bands in the United States
Pac-12 Conference marching bands
1940s establishments in Utah